This is an alphabetical list of films produced in Mauritius.

A
Argile et la flamme, L (1981)

B
Benares (2004) 
Bikhre Sapne (1975)

C
Cathédrale, La (2006)
Cavadée à l'île Maurice, Le (1990) 
C'est la vie (2003)
Charrette, La (1977)
Conversations at Sea (1981)

D
Documentary on MGI (1990)

E
Eduction, L (1987) 
Elections generales (1982) 
Embarrass du choix, L (1972) 
Environmental and Geographical Studies of Mauritius (1986) 
Et le sourire revient (1980)

F
Film on Stress (1990) 
Frames of Reference (2001) (TV)

G
Goodbye My Love (1986/I)

H
Habitat, L (1978)

I
Ik banjara (1978)
Immigrés en France (1982) 
Invitation au voyage (1990) 
Île Maurice, enn novo sime (1983) 
Île Maurice, perle de l'océan indien (1973)

K
Khudgarz (1986)

L
Lonbraz Kann, directed by David Constantin, Mauritius/Réunion Island/France (2014)
Lucy, A (1993)
Lockdown in Mauritius, directed by Khem Ramphul (2020)

M
Maîtres de leur destinée (1978)
Malcolm le tailleur des visions, France-Ile Maurice, par Khal Torabully
La Memoire Maritime des Arabes, France, Oman, Ile Maurice, par Khal Torabully
Mr Sujeewon, The Daredevil (2014)

N
Nés de la mer (1988)

O
Objectif energie (1983) 
Objectif energie (1987)

P
Pic Pic, nomade d'une Ile, ZIFF Award, par Khal Torabully
Portrait d'un chef d'état, Le (1982)

S
Sarl (1986)
Séga à l'île Maurice, Le (1990)

T
Tara (1978) 
Trou d'eau douce (1980)

External links
 Mauritian film at the Internet Movie Database

Mautitius
 
Mass media in Mauritius